"Too Much Finance?" is a scholarly paper by Jean-Louis Arcand, Enrico Berkes, and Ugo Panizza. The paper was originally described in a 2011  VoxEU column, in 2012 it was issued as IMF working paper, and in 2015 was published by the Journal of Economic Growth.

Contributions 
The paper provides empirical evidence for the hypothesis that there is a point after which a growing financial sector starts having a negative impact on economic growth.

Popular Media 
On September 4, 2012, Time Magazine featured the article 'Bankers: Who Needs Them?', based on the working paper. The article features the same quote by James Tobin as the working paper:

It further cites one of the authors, Ugo Panizza who summarizes the working paper as:

On 26 September 2012 the BBC World Service programme Business Daily interviewed one of the authors - Ugo Panizza - on the issue of too much finance for a broadcast on the rise of digital currencies.

On May 26, 2015, the Financial Times published a widely read column by Martin Wolf that discusses the original findings of the "Too much finance?" paper, as well as more recent research by the Bank of International Settlements and IMF which supports these findings. The Financial Times article labels the authors of "Too Much Finance?" as IMF researchers. However, only Berkes was at the IMF when the paper was originally written, Arcand and Panizza are professors of Economics at the Graduate Institute in Geneva.

References

External links 
 "Too Much Finance" at IDEAS
 "Too Much Finance" at Google Scholar

International finance
Economics papers
2012 in economics